This article is a list of cover versions recorded and released by the Beach Boys as a band and as solo artists.

The Beach Boys

Unreleased

Solo

Mike Love

Brian Wilson

Footnotes

References

Bibliography
 
 

 Covered
Beach Boys